Chrysocrambus syriellus is a moth in the family Crambidae. It was described by Hans Zerny in 1934. It is found in Turkey, Lebanon, Syria, Iraq and Afghanistan.

References

Crambinae
Moths described in 1934